is a song by Japanese pop singer Sayuri. It was released as the fifth single of her debut studio album, Mikazuki no Koukai, on March 1, 2017. It reached number 10 on Oricon and Japan Hot 100, making her enter Top 10 for first time in both charts. It was used as the ending for the anime Scum's Wish.

Release
On 15 December 2016, Fuji TV's Noitamina revealed that Sayuri would perform "Parallel Line" as ending theme song for Scum's Wish. Parallel Line was released as a single on 1 March 2017 on three edition; Regular edition, Limited edition and Limited anime edition. The single reached number 10 on Oricon and Japan Hot 100 and 4 on Japan Hot Animation with spent 8, 5 and 6 weeks respectively.

Music video
The music video for "Parallel Line" was directed by Yasuhiro Arafune and the storyboards were created from Scum's Wish's author Mengo Yokoyari. The video features Sayuri singing in front of mirrors with night sky and cracked glass effect. Sometimes scene shifts to a classroom and a white background. It was also mixed with the scene from anime Scum's Wish.

Track listing
All tracks written by Sayuri.

Regular edition

Limited edition

Limited anime edition

Charts

Release history

References

Sayuri (musician) songs
2017 singles
Songs written by Sayuri (musician)
Anime songs
2017 songs